

Men's events

Women's events

Medal table

1999
Events at the 1999 Pan American Games
Shooting competitions in Canada
1999 in shooting sports